Davidovka is a settlement in Belarus. It was founded as a Jewish farming settlement.

References 

Populated places in Gomel Region
Svietlahorsk District